The 1970 British Grand Prix was a Formula One motor race held at Brands Hatch on 18 July 1970. It was race 7 of 13 in both the 1970 World Championship of Drivers and the 1970 International Cup for Formula One Manufacturers.

The 80-lap race was won from pole position by Austrian driver Jochen Rindt, driving a Lotus 72. Rindt took his third consecutive victory after Australian Jack Brabham, driving a Brabham BT33, ran out of fuel at the last corner while leading comfortably, and after Rindt himself had originally been disqualified for having an illegal rear wing. Brabham held on to second place, scoring what would turn out to be his final points in Formula One, with New Zealander Denny Hulme finishing third for McLaren.

This was the first Formula One race for Brazilian future World Champion Emerson Fittipaldi, who qualified 21st and finished eighth in an older Lotus 49. It was also the final F1 race for American Dan Gurney.

Qualifying

Qualifying classification

Race

Classification

Championship standings after the race

Drivers' Championship standings

Constructors' Championship standings

References

British Grand Prix
British Grand Prix
Grand Prix